Zhang Weishuang is a Chinese footballer.

She competed at the 2006 FIFA U-20 Women's World Championship, winning a silver medal. She scored a goal. She competed at the 2008 FIFA U-20 Women's World Cup, where she scored a goal against the United States.

References 

Living people
Year of birth missing (living people)
Chinese women's footballers
Women's association footballers not categorized by position